The Bannerman Baronetcy, of Elsick in the County of Kincardine, is a title in the Baronetage of Nova Scotia. It was created on 28 December 1682 for Alexander Bannerman. The eleventh Baronet was a pioneer military aviator. The twelfth Baronet was a soldier and courtier.

Bannerman baronets, of Elsick (1682)

Sir Alexander Bannerman, 1st Baronet (died 1711)
Sir Alexander Bannerman, 2nd Baronet (died 1742)
Sir Alexander Bannerman, 3rd Baronet (died 1747)
Sir Alexander Bannerman, 4th Baronet (died 1770)
Sir Edward Trotter Bannerman, 5th Baronet (died 1796)
Sir Alexander Bannerman, 6th Baronet (1741–1813)
Sir Alexander Bannerman, 7th Baronet (1769–1840)
Sir Charles Bannerman, 8th Baronet (1782–1851)
Sir Alexander Bannerman, 9th Baronet (1823–1877)
Sir George Bannerman, 10th Baronet (1827–1901)
Sir Alexander Bannerman, 11th Baronet (1871–1934)
Sir Arthur D'Arcy Gordon Bannerman, 12th Baronet KCVO CIE (1866–1955)
Sir Donald Arthur Gordon Bannerman, 13th Baronet (1899–1989)
Sir (Alexander) Patrick Bannerman, 14th Baronet (1933–1989)
Sir David Gordon Bannerman, 15th Baronet OBE (born 1935)

There is no heir to the baronetcy.

Bannerman descendants

 Sir Alexander Bannerman, 1st Baronet (died 1711) m. Margaret Scott
 Sir Alexander Bannerman, 2nd Baronet (died 1742) m. Isabella Macdonald
 Sir Alexander Bannerman, 3rd Baronet (died 1747) m. Isabella Trotter
 Sir Alexander Bannerman, 4th Baronet (died 1770) m. Elizabeth Sedgwick
 Elizabeth Bannerman (d. 1844) m. Sir Alexander Ramsay, 1st Baronet
 Sir Alexander Ramsay, 2nd Baronet (1785–1852)
 Thomas Ramsay (1786–1857) m. (1) Jane Cruikshank; m. (2) Margaret Burnett
 Robert Ramsay (1787–1846) m. (1) Margaret Cruikshank
 Edward Bannerman Ramsay (1793–1872) m. Isabella Cochrane
 Sir William Ramsay (1796–1871)
 Lauderdale Ramsay (1806–1888) m. Sir James Burnett, 10th Baronet
 Sir Edward Trotter Bannerman, 5th Baronet (died 1796)
 Sir Patrick Bannerman m. Margaret Maitland
 Alexander Bannerman (1715–1782) m. Margaret Burnett) (b. 1719)
 Sir Alexander Bannerman, 6th Baronet (1741–1813)
 Thomas Bannerman (1768–1813)
 Sir Alexander Bannerman, 7th Baronet (1769–1840) m. Rachel Irvine
 Maria Bannerman (1771–1826) m. William Keith-Falconer, 6th Earl of Kintore
 James Bannerman (1774–1838) m. Helen Burnett (1784–1864)
 Sir Charles Bannerman, 8th Baronet (1782–1851) m. Anne Bannerman
 Sir Alexander Bannerman, 9th Baronet (1823–1877) m. (1) Lady Arabella Diana Sackville-West; (2) Lady Katherine Ashburnham 
 Ethel Mary Elizabeth Bannerman (1868–1947) m. Charles Carnegie, 10th Earl of Southesk
 Lady Katherine Ethel Carnegie (b. 1892) m. Arthur Rivers Bosanquet
 Charles Carnegie, 11th Earl of Southesk (1893–1992) m. Princess Maud of Fife
 Hon. Alexander Bannerman Carnegie (b. 1894) m. (1) Susan Ottilia de Rodakowski-Rivers; m. (2) Cynthia Averil Gurney
 Lady Mary Elizabeth Carnegie (1899–1996) m. Conolly Abel Smith
 Hon. James Duthac Carnegie (1910–1996) m. Claudia Katharine Angela Blackburn
 Thomas Bannerman (1743–1820) m. Jane Simson
 Sir Alexander Bannerman (1788–1864) m. Margaret Gordon
 Thomas Bannerman (1795–1863) m. Jane Hogarth
 Sir George Bannerman, 10th Baronet (1827–1901) m. Anne Mary Brooke
 Sir Alexander Bannerman, 11th Baronet (1871–1934) m. Joan Mary Harford
 Charles Bannerman (1750–1813) m. Margaret Wilson
 Patrick Wilson Bannerman (1794–1854) m. Anna Maria Johnston
 Patrick Wilson Bannerman (1833–1912) m. Flora Lindsay Vanrenen
 Sir Arthur Bannerman, 12th Baronet (1866–1955) m. (1) Virginia Emilie Bedford; m. (2) Philippa Baumgartner
 Sir Donald Bannerman, 13th Baronet (1899–1989)
 Sir Patrick Bannerman, 14th Baronet (1933–1989)
 Sir David Bannerman, 15th Baronet (born 1935)
 Margaret Bannerman m. Alexander Forbes
 Anne Bannerman (d. 1838) m. Sir Charles Bannerman, 8th Baronet

See also
Elsick House

References

External links

Baronetcies in the Baronetage of Nova Scotia
1682 establishments in Nova Scotia